Foreldrar (Parents) is a 2007 Icelandic film written and directed by Ragnar Bragason. Foreldrar won five Edda Awards in 2007, and follows his 2006 film Börn (Children).

Plot 
Óskar (Ingvar Eggert Sigurðsson), a dentist, has been married for five years and lives with his wife and their adopted children. However, Oscar wants a biological child, and later discovers that his wife has been deceiving him. Einar (Víkingur Kristjánsson), a successful stockbroker, has been living in a hotel for several months while waiting for his wife to take him back. Katrin Rós (Nanna Kristín Magnúsdóttir) has been living in Sweden for eight years, and then returns to Iceland. Her now eleven-year-old son has been brought up by his grandmother, but Katrin wants him back. She gets a job as a dentist's assistant, and although seeking a new life, her difficult past eventually catches up with her.

References

External links

Gagnrýni Topp5.is á Foreldrum 
Sjá bíóbrot (trailer) fyrir Foreldra 
Opinber heimasíða  

2007 drama films
2007 films
Films directed by Ragnar Bragason
Icelandic drama films